George Richard Lane Fox, 1st Baron Bingley, PC (15 December 1870 – 11 December 1947) was a British Conservative politician. He served as Secretary for Mines between 1922 and 1924, and again between 1924 and 1928.

Background and education
Lane Fox was born in London, the son of Captain James Thomas Richard Lane Fox, of Hope Hall and Bramham Park, Yorkshire, and Lucy Frances Jane, daughter of Humphrey St John-Mildmay. He was the great-grandson of George Lane-Fox. He was educated at Eton and at New College, Oxford, and was called to the Bar, Inner Temple, in 1895.

Career
Lane Fox was a militia officer in the 3rd (Militia) Battalion of the Yorkshire Regiment when in April 1902 he was commissioned a second lieutenant in the Yeomanry regiment the Yorkshire Hussars. He served with the regiment in the First World War, was wounded and mentioned in despatches and rose to the rank of lieutenant-colonel.

In the 1906 general election which produced a Liberal landslide, Barkston Ash was one of the few constituencies that went the other way. Lane Fox for the Conservatives defeated the Liberal incumbent Joseph Andrews who had defeated him in a by-election the previous year. He went on to represent the constituency until 1931. He served as Secretary for Mines from 1922 to 1924 and again from December 1924 (after the fall of the first Labour Government) until 1928. He was sworn of the Privy Council in 1926 and was a member of the Indian Statutory Commission. On 24 July 1933 he was elevated to the peerage as Baron Bingley, of Bramham in the County of York.

Family
Lord Bingley married Mary Agnes Emily Wood (born 25 March 1877, died 25 March 1962), daughter of Charles Wood, 2nd Viscount Halifax and sister of E. F. L. Wood, 1st Earl of Halifax, in 1903. They had four daughters:

 Marcia Agnes Mary Lane Fox, b 4 September 1904. In 1929 she married Francis Gordon Ward Jackson, who took the name Lane Fox by deed poll. As Lt-Col Francis Lane Fox he served in World War II and later became Honorary Colonel of the Yorkshire Hussars. On the death of Lord Bingley, Lt-Col 'Joe' and Marcia Lane Fox took over the running of the Bramham Park estate.
 Mary Kathleen Lane Fox, b 19 August 1905, married the 2nd Viscount Bridgeman.
 Dorothy Lane Fox, b 29 November 1909, married Sir Kenneth Wade Parkinson of Creskeld Hall.
 Margaret Lane Fox, b 15 April 1913, married firstly, in 1939, Major Charles Packe, Royal Fusiliers, who was killed in action in Normandy in July 1944. She married secondly, in 1951, James Hunter; they were divorced in 1956. She married thirdly, in 1969, Brigadier Kenneth Hargreaves.

Lord Bingley died in December 1947, aged 76. As he had no sons the barony died with him. Lady Bingley died in March 1962, aged 85.

References

External links 
 

1870 births
1947 deaths
People educated at Eton College
Alumni of New College, Oxford
Lane-Fox, George
English barristers
Members of the Privy Council of the United Kingdom
Lane-Fox, George
Lane-Fox, George
Lane-Fox, George
Lane-Fox, George
Lane-Fox, George
Lane-Fox, George
Lane-Fox, George
Lane-Fox, George
UK MPs who were granted peerages
Barons in the Peerage of the United Kingdom
British Army personnel of World War I
Yorkshire Hussars officers
English landowners
George
Barons created by George V